Epitonium humphreysii, common name Humphrey's wentletrap, is a species of small predatory or ectoparasitic sea snail, a marine gastropod mollusc in the family Epitoniidae, the wentletraps.

Distribution
This wentletrap occurs in the western Atlantic Ocean; it is found from Massachusetts, south throughout Florida and through the Gulf states to Mexico, and also in Brazil.

Description 
The maximum recorded shell length is 24 mm.

Habitat 
The minimum recorded depth for this species is 0 m; maximum recorded depth is 95 m.

References

Further reading 
 Rosenberg G., Moretzsohn F. & García E. F. (2009). Gastropoda (Mollusca) of the Gulf of Mexico, Pp. 579–699 in Felder, D.L. and D.K. Camp (eds.), Gulf of Mexico–Origins, Waters, and Biota. Biodiversity. Texas A&M Press, College Station, Texas.

Epitoniidae
Gastropods described in 1838